Frýdek-Místek District is a district (okres) within the Moravian-Silesian Region of the Czech Republic. Its administrative centre is the city of Frýdek-Místek. It was created by a reform of administrative divisions in 1960. Until the reform, it was a part of Český Těšín District which ceased to exist with the reform.

The creation of the Frýdek-Místek District redrew ethnic lines in the region. Český Těšín District covered the exact southern part of Zaolzie area and Poles were proportionately more numerous there than in the newly gerrymandered Frýdek-Místek District, which also encompasses the ethnically pure Czech areas west of Zaolzie.

Complete list of municipalities
Baška –
Bílá –
Bocanovice –
Brušperk –
Bruzovice –
Bukovec –
Bystřice –
Čeladná –
Dobrá –
Dobratice –
Dolní Domaslavice –
Dolní Lomná –
Dolní Tošanovice –
Fryčovice –
Frýdek-Místek –
Frýdlant nad Ostravicí –
Hnojník –
Horní Domaslavice –
Horní Lomná –
Horní Tošanovice –
Hrádek –
Hrčava –
Hukvaldy –
Jablunkov –
Janovice –
Kaňovice –
Komorní Lhotka –
Košařiska –
Kozlovice –
Krásná –
Krmelín –
Kunčice pod Ondřejníkem –
Lhotka –
Lučina –
Malenovice –
Metylovice –
Milíkov –
Morávka –
Mosty u Jablunkova –
Návsí –
Nižní Lhoty –
Nošovice –
Nýdek –
Ostravice –
Palkovice –
Paskov –
Pazderna –
Písečná –
Písek –
Pražmo –
Pržno –
Pstruží –
Raškovice –
Řeka –
Řepiště –
Ropice –
Sedliště –
Smilovice –
Soběšovice –
Staré Hamry –
Staré Město –
Staříč –
Střítež –
Sviadnov –
Třanovice –
Třinec –
Vělopolí –
Vendryně –
Vojkovice –
Vyšní Lhoty –
Žabeň –
Žermanice

References

External links
 List of municipalities of Frýdek-Místek District  

 
Districts of the Czech Republic